Oxycarpha is a genus of Colombian flowering plants in the tribe Heliantheae within the family Asteraceae.

Species 
The only known species is Oxycarpha suaedifolia, native to the Guajira Peninsula of northeastern Colombia.

References

Heliantheae
Monotypic Asteraceae genera
Flora of Colombia